Esfiz (also Romanized as Esfīz; also known as Kalāteh-ye Esfīz) is a village in Kadkan Rural District, Kadkan District, Torbat-e Heydarieh County, Razavi Khorasan Province, Iran. At the 2006 census, its population was 786, in 185 families.

References 

Populated places in Torbat-e Heydarieh County